The Rand Nature Centre is a national park in Freeport, Grand Bahama, the Bahamas.

Flora and fauna
The park contains at least 130 species of native plants, including whiskbroom fern, uniola, agave and love vine. The park's native pine forest hosts a number of bird species, including red-legged thrushes, Cuban emerald hummingbirds, La Sagra's flycatchers and Bahama yellowthroats.

References

National parks of the Bahamas
Freeport, Bahamas